Rachel Ren (born 16 January 1973 in Beijing) is a Chinese-born Australian synchronized swimmer who competed in the 2000 Summer Olympics.

References

1973 births
Living people
Australian synchronised swimmers
Olympic synchronised swimmers of Australia
Synchronized swimmers at the 2000 Summer Olympics
Chinese synchronized swimmers
Synchronized swimmers from Beijing
Chinese emigrants to Australia